The Caldeira Volcano is the highest mountain, massive stratovolcano and the largest geomorphological structure that forms the island of Faial.

History

Along the western edge of the Ribeirinha Volcano, the Central Volcanic Complex formed about 410,000 years ago, along with several structures that arose from tectonics. Evidence of this process has not been preserved due to subsistence, but it is generally believed that two formations (an Upper and Lower group) reflecting a geochemical variation that occurred about 16,000 years ago. The Lower group (from 410,000 years ago), was marked by the predominance of a Hawaiian/Strombolian eruptive process, that was composed of basaltic and benmoreitic rocks. The secondary, Upper group, was a highly explosive period (sub-Plinian in character), which produced a series of twelve deposits of pumice and surge deposits (pyroclastic flows of trachytic and benmoreitic).

This was one of the last major explosive events recorded in the Azores.

Although the central volcano has not been active within the past two centuries, it has seen activity related to the eruption of Capelinhos (1957–58).  During this period, fumaroles in the caldera became active, and the minor lakes/swamps were dried-up by excessive heat.

The volcano, due to its central nature, is part of each parish on the island (except for Matriz, Conceição and Angustias).

Geography

The Caldeira Volcano is the main geomorphological unit, corresponding to a polygenetic volcano two kilometers at the top and one kilometer at the base. The walls of the crater rim are abrupt, although their slopes increase with altitudes. The superficial cover of the volcano is covered in pyroclastic material, such as pumice rock, phreatic and phreatomagmatic deposits, evidence of pyroclastic flows and lahars. The flanks of the stratovolcano also include the Morro de Castelo Branco and peninsula of denser material that have resisted erosion.

References
Notes

Sources
 
 
 

Stratovolcanoes of Portugal
Calderas of Portugal
Geology of the Azores
Faial Island